Nayara Figueira (born 9 June 1988) is a Brazilian synchronized swimmer. She competed in the women's duet at the 2008 and 2012 Summer Olympics.  Her partner in 2008 and 2012 was Lara Teixeira.

She first teamed up with Teixeira in 2007, so their team only had a year's worth of experience when they competed at the 2008 Summer Olympics.  The Brazilian duet pair did not reach the final, finishing in 13th place.

At the 2009 World Aquatic Championships, the pair made the final, finishing in 11th.

At the 2012 Olympics, the team of Teixeria and Figueria missed the final by only 0.3 points.  Their technical routine costumes were in the style of Romero Brito and their music was by Arnaldo Antunes.  The team also won gold at the South American Synchronised Swimming Championships.

References 

1988 births
Living people
Brazilian synchronized swimmers
Olympic synchronized swimmers of Brazil
Synchronized swimmers at the 2008 Summer Olympics
Synchronized swimmers at the 2012 Summer Olympics
Synchronized swimmers at the 2011 Pan American Games
Pan American Games medalists in synchronized swimming
Pan American Games bronze medalists for Brazil
South American Games gold medalists for Brazil
South American Games medalists in synchronized swimming
Competitors at the 2010 South American Games
Medalists at the 2011 Pan American Games
Swimmers from São Paulo
20th-century Brazilian women
21st-century Brazilian women